The Southern Mallee Football League (SMFL) was an Australian rules football competition that finished in 1996 based in the Mallee  region of Victoria, Australia. The league featured three grades in the Australian rules football competition, being First-Grade, Reserve-Grade and Under 16s.

History
The Southern Mallee Football League was formed in the 1932 and continued until 1996 when it merged with the Northern Mallee Football League to form the Mallee Football League (Victoria).

Clubs

(*) Jeparit and Rainbow merged to form Jeparit-Rainbow at the end of the 1996 season before they moved into the newly formed Mallee Football League (Victoria) in 1997.
(#) Between 1957-1959 Jeparit and Warracknabeal had a second 18 team competing in the Southern Mallee senior competition due to the Wimmera league disbanding their seconds competition.

Premierships

 

Mallee (Victoria)
Defunct Australian rules football competitions in Victoria (Australia)
Sports leagues established in 1932
Sports leagues disestablished in 1996
1932 establishments in Australia
1996 disestablishments in Australia